Chari Sambhu Temple or Gandharadi Temple is located at the bank of river Mahanadi at Gandharadi village (Janhapank area) of Boudh district of Odisha, India. It is famous for twin temples of Nilamadhava and Sidheswar. These temples display high quality architectural work. These temples were developed under the support of the Bhanja leaders of Khinjali mandala in ninth century AD. These temple attracts visitor throughout the year. The temple has been considered a religious site during the Baudh State.

Location 

Governance 
This temple is undertaken by ASI (Archeological Survey of India). Also ASI says that the temples were made in 8th century at the ruling period of King Gandhamardana Dev. The temples are made of Black Pagoda and Black Granite.

See also 

 Boudh district
 Hindu temple architecture

References

External links
 Tourism in Boudh district

 
Hindu temples in Boudh
Hindu temples in Odisha
8th-century Hindu temples